David John "Wrecker" Hrechkosy (November 1, 1951 — March 7, 2012) was a Canadian professional ice hockey forward who played 141 games in the National Hockey League (NHL) for the California Golden Seals and St. Louis Blues.

Career statistics

Regular season and playoffs

External links
 

1951 births
2012 deaths
California Golden Seals players
Canadian ice hockey forwards
Dauphin Kings players
Kansas City Blues players
Kildonan North Stars players
New Haven Blades players
Providence Reds players
Rochester Americans players
Saginaw Gears players
Salt Lake Golden Eagles (CHL) players
Salt Lake Golden Eagles (WHL) players
Ice hockey people from Winnipeg
St. Louis Blues players
Undrafted National Hockey League players
Winnipeg Jets (WHL) players